WJKS (104.3 MHz) is a commercial FM radio station in the Champlain Valley of northern New England in the United States. WJKS broadcasts a country music radio format, simulcast with 100.9 WWFY in Berlin, Vermont.  The two stations are owned by Great Eastern Radio.  WJKS serves the Burlington-Plattsburgh media market, while WWFY serves Barre-Montpelier.

History

Before it went on the air, the station first took the call sign WVFA on May 3, 1991, and changed to WGLV on June 14, 1991. It officially launched on March 15, 1992, with a religious format in Hartford, Vermont. On October 11, 2000, the station launched its WWOD call letters and changed its format to oldies as "Oldies 104.3".

In 2008, the station was granted a U.S. Federal Communications Commission (FCC) construction permit to change its city of license from Hartford, Vermont, to Keeseville, New York, increasing its effective radiated power (ERP) to 25,000 watts and decreasing its tower's height above average terrain (HAAT) to 88 meters/289 feet, using a directional antenna located in Au Sable, New York.

On May 22, 2012, WWOD, along with 28 other Nassau Broadcasting stations in Northern New England, was purchased at bankruptcy auction by Carlisle Capital Corporation, a company controlled by Bill Binnie (owner of WBIN-TV in Derry). WWOD and 11 of the other stations, were then acquire by Vertical Capital Partners, controlled by Jeff Shapiro. As this would put Shapiro over the Federal Communications Commission's ownership limits in the Lebanon-Rutland-White River Junction market, WWOD and WEXP were acquired by Electromagnetic Company, a company controlled by William and Gail Goddard. This transaction was consummated on November 30, 2012, with the WWOD/WEXP portion of the purchase valued at $600,000.

On November 30, 2012, WWOD went silent and swapped call signs with WMXR in Woodstock, Vermont. On July 9, 2013, the call letters were again changed, to WMVY. WMVY returned to the air on October 30, 2013, still operating from the Hartford facility. The call letters became WECM on June 9, 2014.

On November 10, 2014, WECM began transmitting from its new Keeseville facilities stunting with Christmas music, branded as "Ho Ho 104". After the holiday season, the station continued to run the stunt.

Electromagnetic Company sold WECM to Jeffrey D. Shapiro's Great Eastern Radio, LLC in a transaction that was consummated on March 23, 2015. Electromagnetic received a 6.4% equity interest in Great Eastern Radio (valued at $250,000) in exchange.

On June 15, 2015, at noon, after seven months of stunting, the station finally flipped to classic hip hop as "Kiss 104.3", with the new call sign WJKS. On June 15, 2020, WJKS replaced the classic hip hop format with a simulcast of WWFY (100.9 FM), a co-owned country music station in Berlin, Vermont, under the "Froggy 104.3 & 100.9" branding.

On-air staff
Oldies 104.3 used to broadcast oldies music with the following "Oldies Jox":
 Shep Sutton
 Art Steinberg
 Leon Strong
 Brett Adams
 Matt Ryan
 Tracy Thomas
 Traci Fulton
 Ken Webbley

Former staff
 Warren Bailey
 Ted Bilodeau
 Heath Cole
 Chris Garrett
 Dru Johnson
 Pauline Robbins
 Parker Springfield
 Kenn Hayes
 Ronnie Lodge
 Rick Watts
 RJ Crowley
 Gary James
 Doug Welldon

Featured programs
Oldies 104.3 used to broadcast oldies and the following programs:
 The GetUp & Go Morning Show
 Middays With Art Steinberg
 Top 4 at 4 w/Leon Strong
 The Ride Home Reunion w/ Leon Strong
 Brett Adams with Night Time Oldies

Previous logo

References

External links
History and airchecks on WWOD in Lynchburg Virginia in the 1970s

Nassau Broadcasting's plan to "park" the call letters WPLY
FCC construction permit

JKS (FM)
Clinton County, New York
Essex County, New York
Radio stations established in 1992
Country radio stations in the United States